Weston is a village in Marathon County, Wisconsin. It is part of the Wausau Metropolitan Statistical Area. The population was 14,868 at the time of the 2010 census.

History
Initially part of the Town of Weston, the village was founded on March 11, 1996 as a way to secure its borders from neighboring communities. Two-thirds of the original town were split off to form the new village of the same name.

Geography

Demographics

2020 census

2010 census
As of the census of 2010, there were 14,868 people, 5,772 households, and 3,928 families living in the village. The racial makeup of the village was 87.7% White, 0.8% African American, 0.4% Native American, 8.7% Asian, 0.8% from other races, and 1.6% from two or more races. Hispanic or Latino of any race were 2.0% of the population.

There were 5,772 households, of which 36.5% had children under the age of 18 living with them, 51.2% were married couples living together, 11.3% had a female householder with no husband present, 5.5% had a male householder with no wife present, and 31.9% were non-families. 25.1% of all households were made up of individuals, and 7.9% had someone living alone who was 65 years of age or older. The average household size was 2.54 and the average family size was 3.06.

The median age in the village was 35.6 years. 27.4% of residents were under the age of 18; 7.8% were between the ages of 18 and 24; 28.4% were from 25 to 44; 24.8% were from 45 to 64; and 11.5% were 65 years of age or older. The gender makeup of the village was 49.5% male and 50.5% female.

2000 census
As of the census of 2000, there were 12,079 people, 4,572 households, and 3,214 families living in the village. The population density was 567.2 people per square mile (219.0/km2). There were 4,806 housing units at an average density of 87.1 persons/km2 (225.7 persons/sq mi). The racial makeup of the village was 93.11% White, 0.30% African American, 0.40% Native American, 4.88% Asian, 0.02% Pacific Islander, 0.32% from other races, and 0.97% from two or more races. 0.70% of the population were Hispanic or Latino of any race.

There were 4,572 households, out of which 38.0% had children under the age of 18 living with them, 56.5% were married couples living together, 9.8% have a woman whose husband does not live with her, and 29.7% were non-families. 22.2% of all households were made up of individuals, and 5.7% had someone living alone who was 65 years of age or older. The average household size was 2.61 and the average family size was 3.10.

In the village, the population was spread out, with 28.4% under the age of 18, 9.4% from 18 to 24, 33.3% from 25 to 44, 19.7% from 45 to 64, and 9.1% who were 65 years of age or older. The median age was 32 years. For every 100 females, there were 98.3 males. For every 100 females age 18 and over, there were 96.4 males.

The median income for a household in the village was $46,063, and the median income for a family was $52,398. Males had a median income of $36,586 versus $25,047 for females. The per capita income for the village was $20,148. 5.1% of the population and 4.2% of families were below the poverty line. Out of the total people living in poverty, 6.4% are under the age of 18 and 5.9% are 65 or older.

Transportation

Airport
The Central Wisconsin Airport (KCWA) serves Weston, the county and surrounding communities with both scheduled commercial jet service and general aviation services.

Education
The village is served by the D.C. Everest School District. Public schools located in Weston are Mountain Bay Elementary, D.C. Everest Middle School, D.C. Everest Junior High, and D.C. Everest Senior High School.

See also
Kara Neumann case

References

External links
Village of Weston official website
D.C. Everest School District

Villages in Wisconsin
Villages in Marathon County, Wisconsin